Carl "Charles" Roeder (1848 – 9 September 1911) was a German-born British amateur archaeologist, antiquarian, folklorist, philologist, and naturalist, who published his work under the name "Charles Roeder".

Born in Gera, Thuringia, Germany, Carl Roeder immigrated to Manchester, UK from Germany when he was twenty-one years old. He became a clerk in a shipping warehouse and eventually started his own business in Manchester. He devoted his leisure to study of archaeology, folklore, philology, history, geology, and botany. He published articles on his archaeological work concerning Roman Britain in the Transactions of the Lancashire and Cheshire Antiquarian Society. He became in 1887 a member of that society and in 1904 was elected an honorary member.

From 1897 to 1900 Roeder carried out important, pioneering excavations of Roman artifacts from the Castlefied area of Manchester. He reported on his work in his book Roman Manchester (1900).

Roeder wrote and did research on the archaeology, literature, folklore of Lancashire, Cheshire, and the Isle of Man, as well as the Celtic philology of the Isle of Man. He frequently contributed to the newspaper Isle of Man Examiner. He wrote an introduction to a collection of Edward Faragher's poems and folk tales and edited Faragher's Manx translation of Aesop Fables.

Selected publications

References

External links

1848 births
1911 deaths
19th-century antiquarians
20th-century antiquarians
19th-century archaeologists
20th-century archaeologists
British archaeologists
Lancashire and Cheshire Antiquarian Society